Jeppe Johnsson (born 1951) is a Swedish politician of the Moderate Party. He served as member of the Riksdag from 3 October 1994 to 15 August 2009.

External links 
Riksdagen: Jeppe Johnsson (m)

Living people
1951 births
Place of birth missing (living people)
Members of the Riksdag 1994–1998
Members of the Riksdag 1998–2002
Members of the Riksdag 2002–2006
Members of the Riksdag 2006–2010
Members of the Riksdag from the Moderate Party
20th-century Swedish politicians
21st-century Swedish politicians